Sir Donald Wolfit, CBE (born Donald Woolfitt; 20 April 1902 – 17 February 1968) was an English actor-manager, known for his touring wartime productions of Shakespeare. He was especially renowned for his portrayal of King Lear.

Personal life
Wolfit was born at New Balderton, near Newark-on-Trent, Nottinghamshire, and attended the Magnus Grammar School. He made his stage début in 1920 and first appeared in the West End in 1924, playing in The Wandering Jew. He was married three times. His first wife was the actress Chris Castor, and their daughter Margaret Wolfit (1929–2008) was also an actor. He had two children by his second marriage - Harriet Graham, actor and writer, and Adam Wolfit, a photographer. An active Freemason, he became Master of Green Room Lodge in 1965.

Wolfit was made a Commander of the Order of the British Empire in 1950 for his services to the theatre, and knighted in 1957.

Career
He played some major supporting roles at the Old Vic Theatre in 1930, appearing in Richard of Bordeaux with John Gielgud, and finally gained prominence at the Shakespeare Memorial Theatre in 1936 as Hamlet, whereupon he tried to persuade the management to finance him on a tour of the provinces. They declined the invitation, so he withdrew his savings and in 1937 started his own touring company, which he would lead for many years, prompting Hermione Gingold's bon mot: "Olivier is a tour-de-force, and Wolfit is forced to tour."

Shakespearean theatre
Wolfit's speciality was Shakespeare. He was known especially for his Shakespearean touring company which he set up with his own money touring in many countries in the Far East (Asia), Arabia, Australia, USA and England. 

Not only was he a director, he also acted in many of his plays alongside his main leading principal Pamella Carrington Coutte. He was also well known in King Lear and Richard III. He also played Oedipus, and the lead roles in Ben Jonson's Volpone and Christopher Marlowe's Tamburlaine. 

His touring company performed in London during the Battle of Britain in 1940 and Wolfit staged a very successful series of abridged versions of Shakespeare's plays in London during the Second World War in the early afternoon for lunchtime audiences. 

In January 1942, by arrangement with Lionel L. Falck, Donald Wolfit presented Richard III at the Strand Theatre in London. Wolfit played King Richard; others in the production included Eric Maxon (King Edward IV), and Frank Thornton (Sir William Catesby). In 1947 Wolfit proved unpopular with American critics when he took the company to Broadway. He appeared at Stratford during the 1950s in his signature role of King Lear, and was invited to play Falstaff at the RSC in 1962 but turned the offer down when he discovered Paul Scofield would be playing Lear there at the same time, saying "Lear is still the brightest jewel in my crown!" Edith Sitwell wrote to Wolfit: "The cosmic grandeur of your King Lear left us unable to speak. ... all imaginable fires of agony and all the light of redemption are there."

Amongst his many other theatrical roles were appearances in A Murder Has Been Arranged by Emlyn Williams, Agatha Christie's Black Coffee, Constance Cox's The Romance of David Garrick and Bill Naughton's All in Good Time.

Film and radio
Although Wolfit was primarily a stage actor, he appeared in over thirty films, such as Svengali (1954), Blood of the Vampire (1958), Room at the Top (1959), Lawrence of Arabia (1962) and Becket (1964). He worked a good deal for the BBC, performing as King John and Volpone on television, and as Lear, Falstaff and Richard III for radio – as well as modern parts like Archie Rice in The Entertainer.

Death 
Wolfit died on 17 February 1968, at the age of 65 in Hammersmith, London, of cardiovascular disease. His final two films, Decline and Fall... of a Birdwatcher and The Charge of the Light Brigade, were released posthumously. According to Roger Moore, legend had it that on his deathbed, Donald Wolfit said, “Dying is easy, comedy is hard” (however this tale has also been told of Edmund Gwenn, Donald Crisp, and Edmund Kean, and most of Moore's anecdotes are unsourced).

Legacy
Ronald Harwood, who at one time was Wolfit's dresser, based his play The Dresser (later turned into cinema and TV films) on his relationship with Wolfit. Harwood also wrote Wolfit's biography. Peter O'Toole, who worked with Wolfit on several films and plays over the course of his career, considered Wolfit his most important mentor. 

Wolfit was also an important influence on the early acting career of Pamella Carrington Coutte (1925-1959) from the age of 18, he was introduced to her by Noel Coward whom both men could see a very valuable asset to his company as Coutte apart from becoming one of the best Shakespearean actresses in that era, she was the only bilingual actress who was  very fluent in 11 languages. This enabled Wolfit to introduce Shakespeare to other countries as Coutte had the experience to interpret and teach actors to the required languages that were needed. 

Harold Pinter worked for the Donald Wolfit Company alongside Coutte at the King's Theatre, Hammersmith, in 1953–54, performing eight roles with him. 

Wolfit long maintained a bitter hostility to John Gielgud, fuelled by Wolfit's resentment of Gielgud's public school background and family connections in the theatre. The actor Leslie French contrasted the two men: "John was a very gentle person, very caring, with a lovely sense of humour. Donald was a joke, a terrible actor with no sense of humour, who believed he was the greatest in the world. Once John and I took a call in front of the curtain; Donald collapsed in tears because he wasn't called." 

Wolfit's last appearance on stage was in a musical, as the domineering Mr Barrett in Robert and Elizabeth (1966–67).

Donald Wolfit’s acting career declined after Pamella Coutte’s death in 1959 where he struggled losing not only a great actress but a soulmate friend to he whom was very close. He died in 1968.

The papers of Donald Wolfit, and those of his first wife Chris Castor, are archived at the Harry Ransom Center at the University of Texas at Austin as part of their extensive British performing arts holdings. The papers include Wolfit's promptbooks, management records, tour schedules, production papers, scene and costume designs, extensive correspondence, and more. The Ransom Center also holds a small selection of costumes and personal effects from Wolfit and his company, including Wolfit's certification as a Commander of the Order of the British Empire, and Rosalind Iden's gown worn as Beatrice in the company's production of Much Ado About Nothing.

Filmography

Notes

References

External links

 Donald Wolfit Papers and the Chris Castor Papers at the Harry Ransom Center
 John Mayes Family Papers at the Harry Ransom Center
 
 
 Amazon.com link to Wolfit biography
 

1902 births
1968 deaths
British people of English descent
20th-century English male actors
Actors awarded knighthoods
Actor-managers
English male film actors
Freemasons of the United Grand Lodge of England
English male stage actors
Knights Commander of the Order of the British Empire
People educated at Magnus Church of England School
People from Balderton
English male Shakespearean actors
People from Hammersmith
20th-century theatre managers